Ben Ali is an Egyptian wrestler. He competed in the men's Greco-Roman welterweight at the 1960 Summer Olympics.

References

External links
 

Year of birth missing (living people)
Living people
Egyptian male sport wrestlers
Olympic wrestlers of Egypt
Wrestlers at the 1960 Summer Olympics